Szotkówka is a river of Poland, a tributary of the Olza near Godów.  Its own tributaries include the Kolejówka.

Rivers of Poland
Rivers of Silesian Voivodeship